Lindsay is a ghost town in Stanley County, in the U.S. state of South Dakota.

History
The town had the name of Charles Lindsay, a local merchant. A post office called Lindsay was established in 1902, and remained in operation until 1945.

References

Ghost towns in South Dakota
Geography of Stanley County, South Dakota